The Superclass List is a creation of David Rothkopf which his book Superclass: The Global Power Elite and The World They Are Making (published March 2008) is based upon. There are four key elements of success that unite the members of the Superclass, and gives them unparalleled power over world affairs. These elements are: geography, pedigree, networking and luck.

The verified list
In the book Rothkopf writes that his list from 2008 contains 6,000 individuals. The grouping is, however, only defined roughly and as a statistical reality. Rothkopf also writes that list (one in a million, globally), is always in flux. (Note, world population is now 6.9 – 7 billion. so, if published today, the list may contain 7,000 names.)

Rothkopf states that his list is not to be shown in public as there will be so much discussion about who does or does not qualify to be on the list. In interviews he mentions individuals that are on the list. This list contain names that he argues he has verified.

Australia
Rupert Murdoch

Belgium
Albert Frère
Étienne Davignon
Maurice Lippens

Brazil
Luiz Inácio Lula da Silva

Chile
Andronico Luksic

China
Hu Jintao
Fu Chengyu
Ding Lei
Lou Jiwei
Yang Huiyan
Zhou Xiaochuan
Richard Li Tzar Kai

Colombia
Luis Alberto Moreno
Shakira
Julio Mario Santo Domingo

Egypt
Amr Khaled
Amr Moussa

Denmark
Janus Friis

France
Nicolas Sarkozy
Pascal Lamy
Michèle Alliot-Marie
Baudouin Prot
Jean-Claude Trichet

Germany
Angela Merkel
Josef Ackermann
Josef Joffe
Rene Obermann
Reinhard Mohn

India
Lakshmi Mittal
Sonia Gandhi
Ratan Tata
Kalanidhi Maran
Rana Talwar
Kushal Pal Singh
Mukesh Ambani
Indra Nooyi
Tenzin Gyatso

Iran
Shah Reza Pahlavi

Ireland
Bob Geldof

Italy
Silvio Berlusconi

Netherlands
Jeroen van der Veer

Japan
Hiroshi Mikitani
Osamu Suzuki
Akira Mori

Kenya
Wangari Maathai

Kuwait
Sabah Al-Ahmad Al-Jaber Al-Sabah

Lebanon
Sheikh Hassan Nasrallah

Liberia
Ellen Johnson Sirleaf

South Africa
Patrice Motsepe

Mexico
Mario Molina
Genaro Larrea Mota Velasco
Guillermo Ortiz Martinez
Carlos Slim Helú
Joaquín Guzman

Nigeria
Aliko Dangote
Odein Ajumogobia
Francis Arinze

North Korea
Kim Jong-Un Qatar
Sheikh Hamad bin Thamer al-Thani

Russia
Alexei Miller

Vladimir Popovkin
Andrey Likhachev
Oleg Deripaska
SERgEY BABENKOV

Saudi Arabia
Bandar bin Sultan
Al-Waleed bin Talal

Singapore
Ho Ching

South Africa
Nelson Mandela (deceased 2013)Patrice Motsepe
Anton Rupert
Nicky Oppenheimer
Douw Steyn

South Korea
David Yonggi Cho
Frankie Washing Board

Portugal
José Manuel Barroso

Sweden
Carl Bildt
Marcus Wallenberg
Ingvar Kamprad
Fredrik Reinfeldt
Carl-Henric SvanbergAbout 20–30 Swedes are on the list.

Switzerland
Peter Brabeck-Letmathe

Turkey
Kemal Derviş

United Arab Emirates
Khalifa Mohammad Al-Kindi

United Kingdom
Mike Turner
Richard Branson
Bernie Ecclestone
Lakshmi Mittal
John Silvester Varley
Mark Thompson
Stacy Shannon

United States
http://www.newsweek.com/id/130932/output/print |title= Who Is the Superclass? |last= Rothkopf |first= David |author-link= David Rothkopf |date= 2008-04-07 |accessdate= 2008-09-24}}</ref>
Robert Zoellick
Oprah Winfrey
Indra Nooyi
Al Gore
Lee Scott
Michael Mullen
Mark Zuckerberg
Pierre Omidyar
Steve Case
Sumner Redstone
Michael Bloomberg
Rex Tillerson
Ben Bernanke
Ken Lewis
Stephen Green (banker)
Lloyd Blankfein
Sergey Brin
Larry Page
Bill Gates
Warren Buffett
Jerry Yang
Henry "Hank" Paulson
Joshua Bolten

Vatican
Pope Benedict XVI

Venezuela
Lorenzo Mendoza Gimenez
Gustavo Cisneros

 References 

External links
 About the Superclass, Global Politician.
 Who is the Superclass?, Newsweek''.

Political science terminology
Social classes
Social groups